Chamisso Wilderness is a  wilderness area in the U.S. state of Alaska. It was designated by the United States Congress in 1975.

A small subunit of the Chukchi Sea Unit of the Alaska Maritime National Wildlife Refuge, Chamisso Island and nearby Puffin Island were combined as a wildlife refuge in 1912, designated Wilderness in 1975, and added to the AMNWR in 1980.

Chamisso Island, named after the naturalist Adelbert von Chamisso, comprises one large sand spit and a low beach zone surrounding a covering of tundra with a few marshy bogs.  Although Chamisso Island is much larger, Puffin Island houses many more nesting birds, especially horned puffins, black-legged kittiwakes, and thick-billed murres which build their nests on the steep-walled cliffs that fall into Spafarief Bay. Iñupiat cross from the mainland to gather eggs, primarily from kittiwakes and murres.  With the exception of birds and the occasional fox that crosses frozen sea in winter, nothing lives on the islands that make up Chamisso Wilderness.  Walruses, seals, and whales can often be seen in Spafarief Bay.

References

External links
 Chamisso Wilderness - Wilderness.net

Wilderness areas of Alaska
Alaska Maritime National Wildlife Refuge
Protected areas of Northwest Arctic Borough, Alaska
Chukchi Sea
Adelbert von Chamisso
Protected areas established in 1975
1975 establishments in Alaska